Charles Herbert (died 1605), of Hadnock, Monmouthshire, was a Welsh politician.

He was a Member (MP) of the Parliament of England for Monmouth Boroughs in 1571.

References

16th-century births
1605 deaths
16th-century Welsh politicians
People from Monmouthshire
English MPs 1571

Year of birth unknown